Although the United Kingdom has an adversarial political system, there have often been areas of agreement or bipartisanship between the two main parties at the time, currently Labour and the Conservatives, on a number of issues. This may extend to other parties, like the Liberal Democrats or Scottish National Party. Areas of agreement have tended to include Foreign policy and policy towards Northern Ireland.

There is also a convention within British politics to have formal and semi-secret cooperation facilitated by both parties parliamentary whips and senior civil servants, a process often referred to as the usual channels.

US perspectives
US commentators have sought to apply their understanding of bipartisanship to analyses of the UK situation. According to political analyst James Fallows in The Atlantic (based on a "note from someone with many decades' experience in national politics"), bipartisanship is a phenomenon belonging to a two-party system such as the political system of the United States and does not apply to a parliamentary system (such as Great Britain) since the minority party is not involved in helping write legislation or voting for it. Fallows argues that in a two-party system, the minority party can be obstructionist and thwart the actions of the majority party.

However, analyst Anne Applebaum in The Washington Post suggested that partisanship had been rampant in the United Kingdom and described it as "a country in which the government and the opposition glower at each other from opposite sides of the House of Commons, in which backbenchers jeer when their opponents speak." Applebaum suggested there was bipartisanship in the UK with the Conservative/Liberal Democrat coalition in 2010.

References

Politics of the United Kingdom
UK